Grete Ingeborg Johanne Andrea Gram (20 March 1853 – 10 May 1927) was a Norwegian painter. She is best known for her landscapes and portraits.

She was born at the family estate Ask gods in the village of Ask at Norderhov parish in Buskerud. She was a daughter of  Major General Johan Georg Boll Gram (1809–1873). She was a sister of Jens Gram, granddaughter of  Magistrate Jens Jensen Gram, first cousin of Gregers Winther Wulfsberg Gram and aunt of Johan Fredrik Gram and Mads Gram. She married Swedish physician Emil Kleen in 1881 and moved to Stockholm.

She took her education at Knud Bergslien's painting school, and also studied under Eilif Peterssen in the 1870s. In 1879, Peterssen married Andrea Gram's sister Nicoline (1850–1882). Other of Peterssen students at the time were Harriet Backer, Kitty Kielland and Asta Nørregaard.

References 

1853 births
1927 deaths
People from Ringerike (municipality)
19th-century Norwegian painters
20th-century Norwegian painters
Norwegian women painters
19th-century Norwegian women artists
20th-century Norwegian women artists